Tuohetaerbieke Tanglatihan (born 18 November 1996) also known as Erbieke Tuoheta, is a Chinese boxer. He competed in the men's middleweight event at the 2020 Summer Olympics.

Tanglatihan was born to Kazakh parents.

References

External links
 

1996 births
Living people
Chinese male boxers
Olympic boxers of China
Boxers at the 2020 Summer Olympics
Sportspeople from Xinjiang
Boxers at the 2018 Asian Games
Chinese people of Kazakhstani descent